Sailor Springs is a village in Clay County, Illinois, United States. The population was 89 at the 2020 census.

Geography
Sailor Springs is located in eastern Clay County at  (38.763611, -88.361182).

Demographics

As of the 2020 census there were 89 people, 49 households, and 40 families residing in the village. The racial makeup of the village was 91.01% White, 1.12% Asian, and 7.87% from two or more races. Hispanic or Latino of any race were 1.12% of the population.

There were 49 households, out of which 24.49% had children under the age of 18 living with them, 69.39% were married couples living together, 8.16% had a female householder with no husband present, and 18.37% were non-families. 18.37% of all households were made up of individuals, and 6.12% had someone living alone who was 65 years of age or older. The average household size was 2.38 and the average family size was 2.33.

The village's age distribution consisted of 14.9% under the age of 18, 3.5% from 18 to 24, 15.8% from 25 to 44, 42.9% from 45 to 64, and 22.8% who were 65 years of age or older. The median age was 53.5 years. For every 100 females, there were 137.5 males. For every 100 females age 18 and over, there were 142.5 males.

The median income for a household in the village was $63,125, and the median income for a family was $64,250. Males had a median income of $51,000 versus $11,250 for females. The per capita income for the village was $22,834. About 10.0% of families and 20.7% of the population were below the poverty line, including 50.0% of those under age 18 and 11.5% of those age 65 or over.

References

External links
Historic Sailor Springs Foundation

Villages in Clay County, Illinois
Villages in Illinois